John Talbot Clifton (5 March 1819 – 16 April 1882) was an English landowner and Member of Parliament.

Life
He was born into a noted Lancashire family, the son of Thomas Joseph Clifton of Lytham Hall, Lytham, Lancashire and his wife Hatty Treves. He was educated at Eton College, and matriculated at Christ Church, Oxford in 1837. He succeeded his father to the Lytham estate in 1851.

He served as a Justice of the Peace and Deputy Lieutenant for Lancashire and was Colonel of the 1st Royal Lancashire Militia (The Duke of Lancaster's Own). He was elected to Parliament as MP for North Lancashire for 1844–1847, but was a losing candidate in the 1859 election for Preston. He was appointed High Sheriff of Lancashire for 1853.

Clifton died in Algeria in 1882 and was buried at St Cuthberts church, Lytham. He had married Lady Eleanor Cecily Lowther, daughter of Col. Henry Cecil Lowther. He was succeeded by his grandson John Talbot Clifton, his only son, Thomas Henry, who was also MP for North Lancashire, having predeceased him by two years.

A grade II listed drinking fountain as a monument to his memory now stands in Lytham's Sparrow Park.

References

External links 
 

1819 births
1882 deaths
People educated at Eton College
Alumni of Christ Church, Oxford
Conservative Party (UK) MPs for English constituencies
UK MPs 1841–1847
High Sheriffs of Lancashire
Deputy Lieutenants of Lancashire
English landowners
Lancashire Militia officers
19th-century British businesspeople